Penstemon azureus is a flowering plant species known by the common name azure penstemon.

It is native to the mountains of Oregon and northern California. It grows in coniferous forests and woodlands in the Klamath Mountains, North California Coast Ranges, Southern Cascade Range, and Northern Sierra Nevada.

Description
Penstemon azureus is a perennial herb, woody toward the base, with many thin branches reaching up to about 70 centimeters in maximum height. The oppositely arranged leaves are linear or lance-shaped, the ones higher on the plant clasping the stem.

The inflorescence produces several hairless tubular flowers in shades of blue to lavender measuring up to 3.5 centimeters long.

References

External links

azureus
Flora of California
Flora of Oregon
Flora of the Cascade Range
Flora of the Klamath Mountains
Flora of the Sierra Nevada (United States)
Natural history of the California Coast Ranges
Flora without expected TNC conservation status